John Kenneth Inglis, B.Sc., B.A., Dip. Ed., M.Inst. Biol. (1933 - 5 March 2011), was a British biologist, writer, and Further and Higher Education lecturer in Oxford, England.

Life
Educated in the private sector, Nottingham High School and The Becket, preparatory and senior schools, Inglis left school with insufficient qualifications for University entry. He took employment for four years as a technician in chemistry and physics laboratories, whilst studying at the technical college in order to gain acceptable examinations for University entry. Whilst at University, he lived in rooms within bicycling distance of college. With no financial backing from divorced parents, both living in Africa, he supported his college studies by night-portering at a local YMCA hostel, chemistry teaching at High Pavement Grammar school, and by working as a hormones research technician in an industrial hormones research department.
At University, Inglis gained an Arts degree (psychology and philosophy), and a Natural Sciences degree (animal physiology and biochemistry). 
A post-graduate diploma in Educational Psychology and Learning was a further one year of full-time study. Inglis was in his late twenties when he searched for his first full-time employment.
  
Inglis joined the new Oxford Further Education College as one of the founding science faculty members. This college evolved out of a John Brookes earlier foundation, eventually becoming a Polytechnic and later Oxford Brookes University. The biomedical students were drawn from local employers in hospitals and University research laboratories, as well as full-time students seeking University entry qualifications.

In the United States, near Chicago, Inglis tutored anatomy, physiology, biochemistry, and health, to undergraduates at College of Lake County.

In Canada, near Toronto, Inglis tutored undergraduates in anatomy, physiology, and diet therapy, at Durham College.
His textbook work in Canada was in receipt of the  financial `Cocking Award` given annually by a Commonwealth teachers' association for publication work.

Inglis produced 12 textbooks, of which the following are at present in publication: 
"A Textbook of Human Biology"; 
"Introduction to Laboratory Animal Science and Technology";  
"Science for Hairdressing Students"; and
"Oxbook", a handbook for foreign students in Oxford.

Until his death in 2011, he lived in Oxford, with his Dresden-born wife, Ulrike.
His brother, Dr. Douglas B. Inglis, is a consultant chemist, and former university lecturer, living near Cardiff in Wales.

Other activities

Co-founder and secretary of Oxford International Students' Society.  Alpine walking and cross-country skiing in Austria, camping-touring most countries in Europe, most US states and provinces of Canada. At this time, a part-time student at Oxford University reading Philosophy and Politics. Writer of short stories and magazine articles.

References

20th-century British biologists
21st-century British biologists
People educated at Nottingham High School
1933 births
2011 deaths